HVDC DolWin3 is a high voltage direct current (HVDC) link to transmit Offshore wind power to the power grid of the German mainland.    The project differs from most HVDC systems in that one of the two converter stations is built on a platform in the sea.  Voltage-Sourced Converters with DC ratings of 900 MW, ±320 kV are used and the total cable length is 160 km.

The overall project is being built by Alstom with the cables supplied by Prysmian and offshore platform by Nordic Yards.  Construction commenced on the onshore converter station at Dörpen West in May 2014  and on the offshore platform in October 2014. As of summer 2015 the platform was being fitted out and the first converter transformer was installed on 17 July 2015.  The project was handed over to its owner, TenneT, in 2017. The grid connection is in operation since September 2018. A fund managed by Copenhagen Infrastructure Partners has invested in this offshore transmission platform.

See also

High-voltage direct current
Offshore wind power
HVDC BorWin1
HVDC BorWin2
HVDC BorWin3
HVDC DolWin1
HVDC DolWin2
HVDC HelWin1
HVDC HelWin2
HVDC SylWin1

References

External links 
Description of project on TenneT website (in German).
Dolwin3, Alstom website.

Alstom
Electric power transmission systems in Germany
Energy infrastructure completed in 2017
HVDC transmission lines
Wind power in Germany
2017 establishments in Germany